Gayrope (from joining words "Gay" and "Europe") is a slur widely used in Russia (including Russian state owned media) and occasionally in other post-Soviet states, referencing European civilization (as a part of wider Western civilization) as opposed to the ultraconservative Russian civilization. Initially, it only referenced Europe as a place where "LGBT is dominating" (which was seen in a negative context, given that Russia is one of the most LGBT-unfriendly nations in the world), but later it grew to mean the "decay" of European civilization in general, while Russia keeps the "traditional values".

History 
In the beginning of 2000s, Russia–European Union relations were full of optimism, but after a sequence of colour revolutions in post-Soviet states (the Orange Revolution in Ukraine, the Rose Revolution in Georgia and the Tulip Revolution in Kyrgyzstan), those relations started to deteriorate. According to the political scientist Andrew Foxall, it started during the second term of Vladimir Putin in the presidential office (2004—2008) and significantly strengthened during his third term (2012—2018). In the 2010s the feeling of clash of two civilizations strengthened, and promoting freedom of homosexuality in Russia by the West was seen as symbol of the western cultural imperialism and one of the aspects of this confrontation.

The word "Gayrope" became popular during the Euromaidan/Revolution of Dignity in Ukraine in 2013—2014 and the subsequent Russo-Ukrainian War, and it was widely used in both Russia and Ukraine. In 2016 this word was added to the "Russian etymological dictionary" under edition of Oleksandr Anikin, with a tag that this is a "pejorative vulgar neologism".

Political meaning 
According to sociology scientist Tatiana Riabova, Russian anti-Western sentiment presents Europe as being decaying, with one of the explanations for this being the alleged "distortion of natural gender roles". Negative attitude toward Europe is serving as a basis for Russian national identity, and not only exalts Russia for its inhabitants, but also gives it a role of the messiah, the stronghold of traditional family values, destined to "save" Europe and the whole world.

Riabova also states that the concept of "Gayrope" is an important part of legitimizing of the current political regime in Russia, allowing the government to pose itself as keepers of "normality". The forced picture of Russian political opposition as traitors of the state is supplemented by their picture as people with gender deviations. Values of people from the creative class are shown as pervert, and the political activity produced by them as illegitimate, and not worthy of attention.

According to the gender sociologist Tamara Martsenyuk, usage of this word in Ukraine is a good example of the fact that homophobia is still present in the country.

See also 
 European values
 Western culture
 LGBT rights in Russia
 Anti-Western sentiment#Russia

References

Further reading 
 
 
 
 
 

Anti-European sentiment
Homophobic slurs
LGBT in Russia
Political slurs
Russian culture
Russian nationalism
Western culture